The 2014 women's road cycling season was the fourth for the  Alé–Cipollini cycling team, which began as the MCipollini–Giordana in 2011.

Roster

Season victories

Footnotes

References

2014 UCI Women's Teams seasons
2014 in Italian sport
2014